Katrin Gleie (born 6 June 1978) is a Danish rower. She competed in the women's quadruple sculls event at the 2000 Summer Olympics.

References

1978 births
Living people
Danish female rowers
Olympic rowers of Denmark
Rowers at the 2000 Summer Olympics
Place of birth missing (living people)